The Sumed Pipeline (also known as the Suez-Mediterranean Pipeline) is an oil pipeline in Egypt, running from the Ain Sokhna terminal in the Gulf of Suez, near the Red Sea, to offshore Sidi Kerir port, Alexandria in the Mediterranean Sea. It provides an alternative to the Suez Canal for transporting oil from the Persian Gulf region to the Mediterranean.

History
The project for an oil pipeline from the Red Sea to the Mediterranean commenced after the extended closure of the Suez Canal following the Six-Day War in June 1967.  Establishment of the pipeline company was agreed in 1973 between five Arab governments. The Sumed pipeline was opened in 1977.

Technical description
It consists of two parallel lines of  diameter. In 2009 it carried .

Operator
The pipeline is owned by the Arab Petroleum Pipeline Company/Sumed Company, a joint venture of EGPC (50%, Egypt), Saudi Aramco (15%, Saudi Arabia), IPIC (15%, the United Arab Emirates), three Kuwaiti companies (each of 5%), and QatarEnergy (5%, Qatar).

Proposed extension
An extension of the Sumed is being considered. The proposed extension would traverse the Red Sea from Ain Sukhna to the Saudi coast near Sharm al Sheikh, and from there to the terminal of Saudi Arabia's main east-west pipeline in Yanbu.

See also

 Energy in Egypt
 Eilat-Ashkelon Pipeline

References

External links
 Sumed Company

Energy infrastructure completed in 1977
Oil pipelines in Egypt
Oil pipeline companies